Naturally occurring thulium (69Tm) is composed of one stable isotope, 169Tm (100% natural abundance). Thirty-four radioisotopes have been characterized, with the most stable being 171Tm with a half-life of 1.92 years, 170Tm with a half-life of 128.6 days, 168Tm with a half-life of 93.1 days, and 167Tm with a half-life of 9.25 days. All of the remaining radioactive isotopes have half-lives that are less than 64 hours, and the majority of these have half-lives that are less than 2 minutes. This element also has 26 meta states, with the most stable being 164mTm (t1/2 5.1 minutes), 160mTm (t1/2 74.5 seconds) and 155mTm (t1/2 45 seconds).

The isotopes of thulium range in atomic weight from 144.97007 u (145Tm) to 178.95534 u (179Tm). The primary decay mode before the most abundant stable isotope, 169Tm, is electron capture, and the primary mode after is beta emission. The primary decay products before 169Tm are erbium isotopes, and the primary products after are ytterbium isotopes. All isotopes of thulium are either radioactive or, in the case of 169Tm, observationally stable, meaning that 169Tm is predicted to be radioactive but no actual decay has been observed.

List of isotopes 

|-
| 145Tm
| style="text-align:right" | 69
| style="text-align:right" | 76
| 144.97007(43)#
| 3.1(3) μs
|
|
| (11/2−)
|
|
|-
| rowspan=2|146Tm
| rowspan=2 style="text-align:right" | 69
| rowspan=2 style="text-align:right" | 77
| rowspan=2|145.96643(43)#
| rowspan=2|240(30) ms
| p
| 145Er
| rowspan=2|(6−)
| rowspan=2|
| rowspan=2|
|-
| β+ (rare)
| 146Er
|-
| rowspan=2 style="text-indent:1em" | 146mTm
| rowspan=2 colspan="3" style="text-indent:2em" | 71(6) keV
| rowspan=2|72(23) ms
| p
| 145Er
| rowspan=2|(10+)
| rowspan=2|
| rowspan=2|
|-
| β+ (rare)
| 146Er
|-
| rowspan=2|147Tm
| rowspan=2 style="text-align:right" | 69
| rowspan=2 style="text-align:right" | 78
| rowspan=2|146.96096(32)#
| rowspan=2|0.58(3) s
| β+ (85%)
| 147Er
| rowspan=2|11/2−
| rowspan=2|
| rowspan=2|
|-
| p (15%)
| 146Er
|-
| style="text-indent:1em" | 147mTm
| colspan="3" style="text-indent:2em" | 60(5) keV
| 360(40) μs
|
|
| 3/2+
|
|
|-
| 148Tm
| style="text-align:right" | 69
| style="text-align:right" | 79
| 147.95784(43)#
| 0.7(2) s
| β+
| 148Er
| (10+)
|
|
|-
| style="text-indent:1em" | 148mTm
| colspan="3" style="text-indent:2em" |
| 0.7 s
|
|
|
|
|
|-
| rowspan=2|149Tm
| rowspan=2 style="text-align:right" | 69
| rowspan=2 style="text-align:right" | 80
| rowspan=2|148.95272(32)#
| rowspan=2|0.9(2) s
| β+ (99.74%)
| 149Er
| rowspan=2|(11/2−)
| rowspan=2|
| rowspan=2|
|-
| β+, p (.26%)
| 148Ho
|-
| 150Tm
| style="text-align:right" | 69
| style="text-align:right" | 81
| 149.94996(21)#
| 3# s
| β+
| 150Er
| (1+)
|
|
|-
| rowspan=2 style="text-indent:1em" | 150m1Tm
| rowspan=2 colspan="3" style="text-indent:2em" | 140(140)# keV
| rowspan=2|2.20(6) s
| β+ (98.8%)
| 150Er
| rowspan=2|(6−)
| rowspan=2|
| rowspan=2|
|-
| β+, p (1.2%)
| 149Ho
|-
| style="text-indent:1em" | 150m2Tm
| colspan="3" style="text-indent:2em" | 810(140)# keV
| 5.2(3) ms
|
|
| (10+)
|
|
|-
| 151Tm
| style="text-align:right" | 69
| style="text-align:right" | 82
| 150.945483(22)
| 4.17(10) s
| β+
| 151Er
| (11/2−)
|
|
|-
| style="text-indent:1em" | 151m1Tm
| colspan="3" style="text-indent:2em" | 92(7) keV
| 6.6(14) s
| β+
| 151Er
| (1/2+)
|
|
|-
| style="text-indent:1em" | 151m2Tm
| colspan="3" style="text-indent:2em" | 2655.67(22) keV
| 451(24) ns
|
|
| (27/2−)
|
|
|-
| 152Tm
| style="text-align:right" | 69
| style="text-align:right" | 83
| 151.94442(8)
| 8.0(10) s
| β+
| 152Er
| (2#)−
|
|
|-
| style="text-indent:1em" | 152m1Tm
| colspan="3" style="text-indent:2em" | 100(80)# keV
| 5.2(6) s
| β+
| 152Er
| (9)+
|
|
|-
| style="text-indent:1em" | 152m2Tm
| colspan="3" style="text-indent:2em" | 2555.05(19)+X keV
| 294(12) ns
|
|
| (17+)
|
|
|-
| rowspan=2|153Tm
| rowspan=2 style="text-align:right" | 69
| rowspan=2 style="text-align:right" | 84
| rowspan=2|152.942012(20)
| rowspan=2|1.48(1) s
| α (91%)
| 149Ho
| rowspan=2|(11/2−)
| rowspan=2|
| rowspan=2|
|-
| β+ (9%)
| 153Er
|-
| rowspan=2 style="text-indent:1em" | 153mTm
| rowspan=2 colspan="3" style="text-indent:2em" | 43.2(2) keV
| rowspan=2|2.5(2) s
| α (92%)
| 149Ho
| rowspan=2|(1/2+)
| rowspan=2|
| rowspan=2|
|-
| β+ (8%)
| 153Er
|-
| rowspan=2|154Tm
| rowspan=2 style="text-align:right" | 69
| rowspan=2 style="text-align:right" | 85
| rowspan=2|153.941568(15)
| rowspan=2|8.1(3) s
| β+ (56%)
| 154Er
| rowspan=2|(2−)
| rowspan=2|
| rowspan=2|
|-
| α (44%)
| 150Ho
|-
| rowspan=2 style="text-indent:1em" | 154mTm
| rowspan=2 colspan="3" style="text-indent:2em" | 70(50) keV
| rowspan=2|3.30(7) s
| α (90%)
| 150Ho
| rowspan=2|(9+)
| rowspan=2|
| rowspan=2|
|-
| β+ (10%)
| 154Er
|-
| rowspan=2|155Tm
| rowspan=2 style="text-align:right" | 69
| rowspan=2 style="text-align:right" | 86
| rowspan=2|154.939199(14)
| rowspan=2|21.6(2) s
| β+ (98.1%)
| 155Er
| rowspan=2|(11/2−)
| rowspan=2|
| rowspan=2|
|-
| α (1.9%)
| 151Ho
|-
| rowspan=2 style="text-indent:1em" | 155mTm
| rowspan=2 colspan="3" style="text-indent:2em" | 41(6) keV
| rowspan=2|45(3) s
| β+ (92%)
| 155Er
| rowspan=2|(1/2+)
| rowspan=2|
| rowspan=2|
|-
| α (8%)
| 151Ho
|-
| rowspan=2|156Tm
| rowspan=2 style="text-align:right" | 69
| rowspan=2 style="text-align:right" | 87
| rowspan=2|155.938980(17)
| rowspan=2|83.8(18) s
| β+ (99.93%)
| 156Er
| rowspan=2|2−
| rowspan=2|
| rowspan=2|
|-
| α (.064%)
| 152Er
|-
| style="text-indent:1em" | 156mTm
| colspan="3" style="text-indent:2em" | 203.6(5) keV
| ~400 ns
|
|
| (11−)
|
|
|-
| 157Tm
| style="text-align:right" | 69
| style="text-align:right" | 88
| 156.93697(3)
| 3.63(9) min
| β+
| 157Er
| 1/2+
|
|
|-
| 158Tm
| style="text-align:right" | 69
| style="text-align:right" | 89
| 157.936980(27)
| 3.98(6) min
| β+
| 158Er
| 2−
|
|
|-
| style="text-indent:1em" | 158mTm
| colspan="3" style="text-indent:2em" | 50(100)# keV
| ~20 ns
|
|
| (5+)
|
|
|-
| 159Tm
| style="text-align:right" | 69
| style="text-align:right" | 90
| 158.93498(3)
| 9.13(16) min
| β+
| 159Er
| 5/2+
|
|
|-
| 160Tm
| style="text-align:right" | 69
| style="text-align:right" | 91
| 159.93526(4)
| 9.4(3) min
| β+
| 160Er
| 1−
|
|
|-
| rowspan=2 style="text-indent:1em" | 160m1Tm
| rowspan=2 colspan="3" style="text-indent:2em" | 70(20) keV
| rowspan=2|74.5(15) s
| IT (85%)
| 160Tm
| rowspan=2|5(+#)
| rowspan=2|
| rowspan=2|
|-
| β+ (15%)
| 160Er
|-
| style="text-indent:1em" | 160m2Tm
| colspan="3" style="text-indent:2em" | 98.2+X keV
| ~200 ns
|
|
| (8)
|
|
|-
| 161Tm
| style="text-align:right" | 69
| style="text-align:right" | 92
| 160.93355(3)
| 30.2(8) min
| β+
| 161Er
| 7/2+
|
|
|-
| style="text-indent:1em" | 161m1Tm
| colspan="3" style="text-indent:2em" | 7.4(2) keV
| 5# min
|
|
| 1/2+
|
|
|-
| style="text-indent:1em" | 161m2Tm
| colspan="3" style="text-indent:2em" | 78.20(3) keV
| 110(3) ns
|
|
| 7/2−
|
|
|-
| 162Tm
| style="text-align:right" | 69
| style="text-align:right" | 93
| 161.933995(28)
| 21.70(19) min
| β+
| 162Er
| 1−
|
|
|-
| rowspan=2 style="text-indent:1em" | 162mTm
| rowspan=2 colspan="3" style="text-indent:2em" | 130(40) keV
| rowspan=2|24.3(17) s
| IT (82%)
| 162Tm
| rowspan=2|5+
| rowspan=2|
| rowspan=2|
|-
| β+ (18%)
| 162Er
|-
| 163Tm
| style="text-align:right" | 69
| style="text-align:right" | 94
| 162.932651(6)
| 1.810(5) h
| β+
| 163Er
| 1/2+
|
|
|-
| 164Tm
| style="text-align:right" | 69
| style="text-align:right" | 95
| 163.93356(3)
| 2.0(1) min
| β+
| 164Er
| 1+
|
|
|-
| rowspan=2 style="text-indent:1em" | 164mTm
| rowspan=2 colspan="3" style="text-indent:2em" | 10(6) keV
| rowspan=2|5.1(1) min
| IT (80%)
| 164Tm
| rowspan=2|6−
| rowspan=2|
| rowspan=2|
|-
| β+ (20%)
| 164Er
|-
| 165Tm
| style="text-align:right" | 69
| style="text-align:right" | 96
| 164.932435(4)
| 30.06(3) h
| β+
| 165Er
| 1/2+
|
|
|-
| 166Tm
| style="text-align:right" | 69
| style="text-align:right" | 97
| 165.933554(13)
| 7.70(3) h
| β+
| 166Er
| 2+
|
|
|-
| style="text-indent:1em" | 166mTm
| colspan="3" style="text-indent:2em" | 122(8) keV
| 340(25) ms
| IT
| 166Tm
| 6−
|
|
|-
| 167Tm
| style="text-align:right" | 69
| style="text-align:right" | 98
| 166.9328516(29)
| 9.25(2) d
| EC
| 167Er
| 1/2+
|
|
|-
| style="text-indent:1em" | 167m1Tm
| colspan="3" style="text-indent:2em" | 179.480(19) keV
| 1.16(6) μs
|
|
| (7/2)+
|
|
|-
| style="text-indent:1em" | 167m2Tm
| colspan="3" style="text-indent:2em" | 292.820(20) keV
| 0.9(1) μs
|
|
| 7/2−
|
|
|-
| rowspan=2|168Tm
| rowspan=2 style="text-align:right" | 69
| rowspan=2 style="text-align:right" | 99
| rowspan=2|167.934173(3)
| rowspan=2|93.1(2) d
| β+ (99.99%)
| 168Er
| rowspan=2|3+
| rowspan=2|
| rowspan=2|
|-
| β− (.01%)
| 168Yb
|-
| 169Tm
| style="text-align:right" | 69
| style="text-align:right" | 100
| 168.9342133(27)
| colspan=3 align=center|Observationally Stable
| 1/2+
| 1.0000
|
|-
| rowspan=2|170Tm
| rowspan=2 style="text-align:right" | 69
| rowspan=2 style="text-align:right" | 101
| rowspan=2|169.9358014(27)
| rowspan=2|128.6(3) d
| β− (99.86%)
| 170Yb
| rowspan=2|1−
| rowspan=2|
| rowspan=2|
|-
| EC (.14%)
| 170Er
|- 
| style="text-indent:1em" | 170mTm
| colspan="3" style="text-indent:2em" | 183.197(4) keV
| 4.12(13) μs
|
|
| (3)+
|
|
|-
| 171Tm
| style="text-align:right" | 69
| style="text-align:right" | 102
| 170.9364294(28)
| 1.92(1) y
| β−
| 171Yb
| 1/2+
|
|
|-
| style="text-indent:1em" | 171mTm
| colspan="3" style="text-indent:2em" | 424.9560(15) keV
| 2.60(2) μs
|
|
| 7/2−
|
|
|-
| 172Tm
| style="text-align:right" | 69
| style="text-align:right" | 103
| 171.938400(6)
| 63.6(2) h
| β−
| 172Yb
| 2−
|
|
|-
| 173Tm
| style="text-align:right" | 69
| style="text-align:right" | 104
| 172.939604(5)
| 8.24(8) h
| β−
| 173Yb
| (1/2+)
|
|
|-
| style="text-indent:1em" | 173mTm
| colspan="3" style="text-indent:2em" | 317.73(20) keV
| 10(3) μs
|
|
| (7/2−)
|
|
|-
| 174Tm
| style="text-align:right" | 69
| style="text-align:right" | 105
| 173.94217(5)
| 5.4(1) min
| β−
| 174Yb
| (4)−
|
|
|-
| 175Tm
| style="text-align:right" | 69
| style="text-align:right" | 106
| 174.94384(5)
| 15.2(5) min
| β−
| 175Yb
| (1/2+)
|
|
|-
| 176Tm
| style="text-align:right" | 69
| style="text-align:right" | 107
| 175.94699(11)
| 1.85(3) min
| β−
| 176Yb
| (4+)
|
|
|-
| 177Tm
| style="text-align:right" | 69
| style="text-align:right" | 108
| 176.94904(32)#
| 90(6) s
| β−
| 177Yb
| (7/2−)
|
|
|-
| 178Tm
| style="text-align:right" | 69
| style="text-align:right" | 109
| 177.95264(43)#
| 30# s
| β−
| 178Yb
|
|
|
|-
| 179Tm
| style="text-align:right" | 69
| style="text-align:right" | 110
| 178.95534(54)#
| 20# s
| β−
| 179Yb
| 1/2+#
|
|

References 

 Isotope masses from:

 Isotopic compositions and standard atomic masses from:

 Half-life, spin, and isomer data selected from the following sources.

 
Thulium
Thulium